Annabelle Natalie Gibson (born 8 October 1991) is an Australian convicted scammer and pseudoscience advocate. She is the author of The Whole Pantry mobile app and its later companion cookbook. Throughout her career as a wellness guru, Gibson falsely claimed to have been diagnosed with multiple cancer pathologies, including malignant brain cancer, and that she was effectively managing them through diet, exercise, natural medicine, and alternative therapies. She additionally alleged that she had donated significant proportions of her income and her company's profits to numerous charities.

In March 2015, after reports identified Gibson's fraudulent claims regarding her charitable donations, media investigation revealed that she had also fabricated her stories of cancer, and lied about her age, personal life and history. Concerns were expressed that Gibson had led a profligate lifestyle, renting an upmarket town house, leasing a luxury car and office space, undergoing cosmetic dental procedures, purchasing designer clothes and holidaying internationally, using money claimed to have been raised for charity. With a collapsing social media support base, Gibson admitted in an April 2015 interview that her claims of having multiple cancers had been fabricated, stating that "none of it's true".

Her actions were described as "particularly predatory" and "deceit on a grand scale, for personal profit". On 6 May 2016, Consumer Affairs Victoria announced legal action against Gibson and Inkerman Road Nominees Pty Ltd (originally known as Belle Gibson Pty Ltd) for "false claims by Ms. Gibson and her company concerning her diagnosis with terminal brain cancer, her rejection of conventional cancer treatments in favour of natural remedies, and the donation of proceeds to various charities." On 15 March 2017, the Federal Court supported most of those claims, concluding that, "Ms. Gibson had no reasonable basis to believe she had cancer."

Biography
Gibson was born in Launceston, Tasmania. According to interviews she has given, she left her Brisbane family home at age 12 to live with a classmate, and later lived with a family friend. Gibson attended Wynnum State High School in Manly, Queensland, until dropping out in Year 10, although she also later claimed to have been homeschooled. She worked for some time as a trainee for catering supply company PFD Food Services in Lytton, but social media reflected that by late 2008 she had relocated to Perth, Western Australia. There, she was involved in the skateboarding culture and actively participated in its online community. Gibson subsequently moved from Perth to Melbourne in July 2009 and became a mother one year later, at age 18. Gibson launched The Whole Pantry mobile app in August 2013, at age 21.

Gibson reportedly told a prospective business partner in 2014 that she had "several names" that she went under, and in her most recent interview with The Australian Women's Weekly claimed "her mother changed her name five times". Gibson's corporate filings indicate that she is three years younger than she publicly claims to be.

The Whole Pantry
After Gibson launched The Whole Pantry app, it was reportedly downloaded 200,000 times within its first month. It was voted Apple's Best Food and Drink App of 2013. Gibson soon after signed a book deal with Lantern Books, an imprint of Penguin Books, for an accompanying table top cookbook, which was published in October 2014. She further worked with Apple Inc. in September 2014 to transition the app as a privileged pre-installed default third party inclusion in the Apple Watch's April 2015 launch. By early 2015, it was estimated that in excess of $1 million had been made in sales of The Whole Pantry app and book. Gibson chronicled her battle with cancer on a blog of the same name, but "doubts about her claims surfaced after she failed to deliver a promised $300,000 donation to a charity".

Before doubts were raised about her health and charitable donation claims, Gibson had intended to expand her brand beyond the app, having earlier registered the domain The Whole Life, and advertised in December 2014 to recruit an IT specialist to expand the app and brand portfolio. Both The Whole Pantry app and The Whole Life were registered by Gibson's partner, Clive Rothwell, in her corporate name. The Whole Pantry registrar was amended in March 2015 after the controversy broke.

While The Whole Pantry has unequivocally denied that Gibson ever helped anyone to reject conventional cancer treatment, Gibson has been quoted from her social media posts as claiming that she had "countless times helped others" to forgo conventional medical treatment for cancer and to treat themselves "naturally", as well as "leading them down natural therapy for everything from fertility, depression, bone damage and other types of cancer".

Health claims
In interviews, Gibson claimed to have had malignant brain, blood, spleen, uterine, liver, and kidney cancers, which she attributed to a reaction to the Gardasil cervical cancer vaccine. When the book was launched in November 2014, Gibson claimed in its preface that she had been "stable for two years now with no growth of the cancer", but her story soon emerged as inconsistent: she also told media outlets that the cancer had reached her liver and kidneys, and three months earlier had posted on The Whole Pantrys Facebook page that her cancer had spread to her brain, blood, spleen, and uterus. She previously claimed that she had undergone heart surgery several times and to have momentarily died on the operating table. Gibson also claimed to have had a stroke. However, she was unable to substantiate her medical claims nor name the doctors who diagnosed and treated her. She also did not bear any surgical scars from her apparent heart operations.

Gibson's and The Whole Pantrys statements regarding the benefits of exercise, healthy eating and a positive mindset were uncontroversial, being widely acknowledged as conducive to holistic well-being. However, on her now-deleted Instagram account and in other social media, Gibson also promoted more controversial or potentially dangerous alternative medical practices, including Gerson therapy, anti-vaccination, and the consumption of non-pasteurised raw milk.

The highly controversial Gerson therapy had been similarly promoted by another Australian wellness blogger, Jessica Ainscough, whose funeral Gibson attended when Ainscough died from cancer in late February 2015. With approximately 97% of the Australian population under seven years of age immunised, Federal vaccination policy heavily penalises parents who refuse to vaccinate their children, by denying access to significant welfare and other benefits, worth approximately $11,700 per annum. The sale of raw milk for human consumption is illegal in Australia and, in Victoria, one three-year-old died and another four children under the age of five became seriously ill after consuming non-pasteurised milk in 2014.

Charitable claims
As Gibson's medical claims were being scrutinised, allegations emerged that charitable contributions raised in 2013 and 2014 had not been given to their intended causes. Gibson denied the charges, but Fairfax Media revealed that she had "failed to hand over proceeds solicited in the name of five charities" and had "grossly overstated the company's total donations to different causes." Two charities confirmed to The Australian newspaper that Gibson's company had used their names in fundraising drives but had either failed to deliver the donations or had inadequately accounted for the funds.

Gibson had claimed on a number of occasions in 2014 that The Whole Pantry had donated approximately $300,000 to charities, including maternal healthcare in developing nations, medical support for children with cancer, and funding schools in sub-Saharan Africa. In late 2014, when The Whole Pantry app was pre-installed on the Apple iPad, Gibson claimed through her Instagram account to be working with twenty different charities. Gibson has long claimed in her LinkedIn professional networking profile, established in February 2013, to be a philanthropist.

Gibson eventually admitted, in relation to fraud proceedings, that she had seriously overstated the level of charitable contributions that had been made. Subsequent media reports in March 2015 revealed that it could only be ascertained that an estimated $7,000 of the previously claimed $300,000 had been donated to a total of three charities, with at least $1,000 of the $7,000 reportedly having been donated only after Gibson became aware of the Fairfax investigation into her earlier claims. Another $1,000 of the $7,000 had been donated to a charitable cause under Rothwell's name, rather than Gibson's or the company name.

Also in March 2015, the parents of a young child with brain cancer, whom Gibson had befriended, came forward to report that they had been unaware that Gibson had earlier been claiming to be fundraising for their child's treatment on their behalf. The family had never received any funds from her or The Whole Pantry, and suspected Gibson had been using information gleaned from the family's experiences to underpin her own claims to have brain cancer.

Concern over publisher culpability
As the controversy grew, questions began to be raised about Apple, Penguin and the Australian media's lack of due diligence in prima facie accepting Gibson's claims of having multiple cancers, an issue taken up by the ABC's Media Watch program.

Apple Inc., in response to media enquiry in March 2015, declined to remove The Whole Pantry app from sale, stating that it was only concerned about the functionality of the app. However, The Whole Pantry was soon thereafter removed from inclusion in the Apple Watch launch. Apple subsequently deleted the app from the Apple Store, and removed it from all Apple Watch promotional material. Apple has not provided any public comment regarding the reasons behind the removal of the app, but an internal email from an Australian executive to the company's US office acknowledged that the removal would be subject to comment.

Lantern Books, when initially approached by investigative journalists, claimed it had not confirmed the validity of Gibson's cancer claims as it was not required for a cookbook. Soon after, as the controversy grew, Penguin withdrew the book from sale, citing a lack of response from Gibson to its queries relating to the media accusations. However, Fairfax reported that Penguin had, prior to publication of the book, already quizzed and videotaped Gibson on her cancer story, as recounted in the preface. Penguin agreed to pay A$30,000 to the Victorian Consumer Law Fund as a penalty for failing to validate the factual content of the book.

Elle Australia magazine, published by Bauer Media Group, admitted that following a laudatory December 2014 story on Gibson, they had received but ultimately dismissed anonymous claims that she was fabricating her story. A second Bauer magazine, Cosmopolitan, which had awarded Gibson its 2014 "Fun Fearless Female" social media award, admitted that it too had received and dismissed a similar email. After Gibson's confessions, the magazine decided not to strip her of the award, stating that she had been "reader nominated and reader voted." However, a month earlier, Cosmopolitans associate editor stated that they "put forward the nomination myself", indicating that the magazine  not the public  had been instrumental in promoting Gibson's award.

A conventional cancer research professional from the Garvan Institute of Medical Research also went public to state that, by failing to conduct basic fact checking and providing "unfiltered PR" to Gibson's untested claims, an uncritical media had been complicit in her "scam".

Erasing the story
Once the controversy surfaced in the media, The Whole Pantry began removing any comments made on its (since deleted) Facebook page that questioned Gibson's claims, asserting that these comments only added to "the misinformation" of the initial Fairfax article. This selective deletion drew even more negative comment.

Simultaneously, posts that Gibson had made on her Instagram account that made reference to her cancers or charitable donations were also selectively deleted. Soon after, all posts were deleted from Gibson's and The Whole Pantrys Instagram accounts. Around the same time, individual postings about Gibson's cancer, and claims of having died briefly while under heart surgery, were also being selectively deleted by the administrator of her blog "at the request of a user". Accounts across a number of social media platforms were soon either abandoned, made private, or deleted in their entirety.

Gibson subsequently established another Facebook account under the alias Harry Gibson, which was made private and used to hit back at Facebook followers questioning her claims or speaking to the media.

Admission of deceit
In late April 2015, Gibson gave an interview to The Australian Women's Weekly, in which she admitted to having fabricated all her cancer claims. Gibson attributed her deceit to her upbringing, and specifically to neglect by her now-estranged mother, claiming to having been forced to take care of herself and her brother since the age of 5. The interview was, however, described as an admission of deceit, without expression of regret or apology. In a May 2015 interview with the same magazine, Gibson's mother Natalie Dal-Bello refuted several claims Gibson had made about her family, including the false claim that her brother was autistic. Gibson's Women's Weekly interview was arranged by Bespoke Approach, and Gibson was provided pro bono representation by the company during the interview.

In June 2015, Gibson was rumoured to have received A$45,000 for an interview with Nine Network's 60 Minutes.

Legal action
Consumer Affairs Victoria brought legal action against Gibson for allegedly breaking Australian consumer law. The regulator said it had conducted an in-depth investigation of Gibson's activities and applied to Australia's Federal Court for leave to pursue legal action. Gibson's publisher, Penguin Australia, has already agreed to pay $30,000 to the Victorian Consumer Law Fund as a penalty for releasing The Whole Pantry, which was not fact checked.

On 15 March 2017, Federal Court Justice Debra Mortimer delivered the decision that "most but not all" of the claims against Gibson were proven. Gibson did not appear in court for the decision. Justice Mortimer found that Gibson's claims had been misleading and deceptive, and that "Ms. Gibson had no reasonable basis to believe she had cancer from the time she began making these claims in public to promote The Whole Pantry Book and the apps in mid-2013", but there was not enough evidence to prove that she was not acting out of delusion.

In September 2017, Gibson was fined $410,000 for making false claims about her donations to charity. , Gibson had not yet paid the fine, and authorities were seeking power to charge her with contempt of court. A new trial was set for 14 May and she faced an undetermined number of years in jail if she did not attend. As of mid-September 2019, Gibson still had not paid, claiming to be broke, and Consumer Affairs Victoria were still seeking to enforce the penalty. In a 2017 letter later released by the Federal Court, Gibson had stated that she was $170,000 in debt, and had $5,000 to her name.

House raid by police
On 22 January 2020, the Sheriff's Office of Victoria raided Gibson's home in Northcote and seized items to recoup Gibson's unpaid fines, which, due to interest and costs, exceeded half a million dollars.

Her home was raided again on 21 May 2021 to "try to recoup her unpaid fines".

Claimed adoption into Oromo community
The day after the first raid, on 23 January 2020, a Shabo Media video from October 2019 surfaced in which Gibson was wearing a headscarf and speaking partially in Oromo language (referring to herself as "Sanbontu"), discussing the political situation in Ethiopia with an interviewer and referring to Ethiopia as "back home". She professed to have been adopted by the Ethiopian community in Melbourne after volunteering for four years, calling the adoption a gift from "Allah".

However, on the same day, the president of the Australian Oromo Community Association in Victoria, Tarekegn Chimdi, stated that Gibson was not a registered volunteer, "is not a community member and she's also not working with the community," and that he had only seen her at events two or three times. He expressed that nobody seemed to know who she was and he had only just learnt of her backstory, and expressed a desire for her to stop saying she is part of the community.

See also
Ashley Kirilow, Canadian fraudster who raised money for cancer charities by falsely claiming that she had cancer
Michael Guglielmucci cancer scandal
Diet and cancer
Munchausen syndrome

References

External links
Archive of The Whole Pantry website, registered by Gibson.

What to Trust in a "Post-Truth" World, Alex Edmans TED talk.

Australian fraudsters
Health fraud
Living people
Criminals from Melbourne
21st-century Australian writers
21st-century Australian criminals
1991 births
People from Launceston, Tasmania
Pseudoscientific diet advocates
Alternative cancer treatment advocates
Confidence tricksters
Medical controversies in Australia
People convicted for health fraud